Formosiella is a genus of ground beetles in the family Carabidae. There are at least four described species in Formosiella.

Species
These four species belong to the genus Formosiella:
 Formosiella brunnea Jedlicka, 1951
 Formosiella flavomaculata (Shibata, 1964)
 Formosiella sichuanensis Kirschenhofer, 2012
 Formosiella vietnami Kirschenhofer, 1994

References

Lebiinae